I series may refer to:
 IBM System i
Isuzu i series
QI (I series), the ninth series of the TV quiz show QI
BMW I series, a sub-brand of BMW founded in 2011 focused on manufacturing of plug-in electric vehicles

See also
 H series (disambiguation)
 J series (disambiguation)
 1 series (disambiguation)